Salvatore Di Silvestro, best known as Rino Di Silvestro (30 January 1932 - 3 October 2009) was an Italian director, screenwriter, producer and actor.

Life and career 
Born in  Rome, Di Silvestro became first known thanks to Op bop pop nip, a piece he wrote, directed and starred, which was continuously represented   at the Teatro delle Muse in Rome from 1962 to 1966.  After having collaborated uncredited to the screenplays of a number of genre films, in 1973 he made his debut as director with Women in Cell Block 7, a film which his regarded as the first Italian women in prison film.

Selected filmography 
 Women in Cell Block 7 (1973)
 Prostituzione (1974)
 Deported Women of the SS Special Section (1976)
 Werewolf Woman (1976)
 Hanna D. - The Girl from Vondel Park (1984)
 The Erotic Dreams of Cleopatra (1985)

References

External links 
 

1932 births
2009 deaths
Giallo film directors
Italian film directors
20th-century Italian screenwriters
Italian male film actors
Italian film producers
People from the Province of Cuneo
Writers from Rome
Male actors from Rome
Italian male screenwriters
20th-century Italian male writers